Hinduism is a minority faith in Czech Republic followed by 0.02% (2,024) of the population as of 2021. Hindus are represented by three communities: Czech Hindu Religious Society, Hare Krishna Movement and Vishva Nirmala Dharma.

Communities

Czech Hindu Religious Society 

The Česká Hinduistická Náboženská Společnost (Czech Hindu Religious Society) was registered as a religious community in 2002.

ISKCON 

Hare Krishna became an officially recognized religion in 2002. It has four temples in the country. There are 200 devout followers of Hare Krishna in the Republic. The members of the Hare Krishna movement have been troubled by accusations of cult-like behavior.

Vishva Nirmala Dharma 
In 2007, Vishva Nirmala Dharma became a registered religious community in the country.

Demographics
The Demographics of Hindus in Czech Republic:

See also
Hinduism in Slovakia
Hinduism in Guadeloupe

References

External links
 Česká hinduistická náboženská společnost
 ISKCON (Hare Krišna)

Hinduism by country
Religion in the Czech Republic
Hinduism in Europe